Wolf Creek is an unincorporated community in Washington County, in the U.S. state of Ohio.

History
An old variant name was Wolf Creek Mills. The namesake Wolf Creek mill was a gristmill built in 1789 on Wolf Creek. A post office called Wolf Creek was established in 1888, and remained in operation until 1903.

References

Unincorporated communities in Washington County, Ohio
Unincorporated communities in Ohio